London Country South West (LCSW) was a bus operator in South East England and London. It was formed from the split of London Country Bus Services in 1986 and operated a fleet of around 415 buses from 10 garages, with its headquarters in Reigate.

History

In the run-up to deregulation, London Country Bus Services was broken into four smaller companies on 7 September 1986. The South West division contained 415 buses.

On 19 February 1988, LCSW was sold to the Drawlane Group. In 1989 the London & Country trading name was adopted, being applied to a new two-tone green and red livery.

LCSW entered the London Regional Transport market, winning several contracts using second-hand Leyland Atlanteans from Greater Glasgow, GM Buses and Busways, where deregulation was making the major fleets dispose of large numbers of surplus vehicles.

LCSW then purchased new buses, with a batch of Dennis Dominators purchased for route 131, later followed by thirteen 88-seater East Lancs bodied Volvo Citybuses, entered service at Addlestone garage in September 1989, displacing Leyland Atlanteans.

In 1989, the airport coach operations at Crawley and Staines had been split off as Speedlink Airport Services. Additionally the private hire fleet was consolidated into Guildford and re-branded Countryliner. A new garage was opened in Newington Butts, near Elephant & Castle for the operation of London Regional Transport tendered route 78 and part of route 176, this was later moved to the more suitable ex London Transport Walworth garage. Following LCSW successfully tendering to operate route 320 from Westerham to Bromley, buses were outstationed at Kentish Bus' Dunton Green garage from 1 September 1990.

Garages at the time were Crawley, Dorking, Guildford, Leatherhead, Staines, Reigate, Addlestone, Chelsham and Godstone, as well as an outstation of Crawley at Broadbridge Heath.

In 1990, to cater for an increase in tendered London Regional Transport services, a new Beddington Road garage was built, with Chelsham and Godstone closing.

Acquisitions of London & Country during 1989-1995 were:
Horsham Buses and their garage at Warnham.
Gem Fairtax, mainly based at Crawley.
The former Alder Valley operations and garages at Cranleigh, Guildford and Woking which were rebranded West Surrey Buses and later Guildford & West Surrey.
Blue Saloon ABC Taxis of Slyfield, Guildford was acquired and merged with the Countryliner fleet.
AML Coaches, a small operator based in Hounslow and their garage and some buses were retained for a time.
As well as Scarlett Coaches of Minehead (1992-94), Stanbridge & Crichel/Oakfield Tarvel of Dorset (1992-93), Southend Transport, Colchester Borough Transport and District Bus of Essex and a small coach operator in North London.

In November 1992, the Drawlane Group was restructured as British Bus.

Garages by 1992 were located at Cranleigh, Crawley, Croydon, Guildford, Hounslow, Leatherhead, Reigate, Slyfield, Walworth, Warnham and Woking, with buses outstationed at Kentish Bus' Dunton Green garage.

In 1996, with the demise of the National Greenway project, a new garage was opened at Merstham to replace the facility at Reigate.

Also the Croydon, Dunton Green and Walworth operations were separated off into a new Londonlinks company, which was itself a subsidiary of fellow British Bus company Maidstone & District. The garages returned to London & Country management in late 1998, and in November 1999 became part of Arriva London.

On 1 August 1996, British Bus was sold to the Cowie Group, which in November 1997 was rebranded as Arriva.

In 1997, a new garage was opened at Greenford, intended to replace Hounslow, to operate route 105. Also Leatherhead garage closed and for a short time buses for London Regional Transport contract buses were out-stationed at Fulwell bus garage.

During 1999 and 2000, the London & Country and Guildford & West Surrey brands fell out of use, being replaced by Arriva Southern Counties and Arriva London. The fleet that were usually transferred to Arriva Southern Counties is Dennis Dart SLF and Dennis Dominator buses.

With the loss of the Redhill Surrey tenders, in March 2001 Crawley garage was sold to Metrobus.

References

Arriva Group bus operators in England
Former bus operators in England
Former London bus operators
1986 establishments in England
Former bus operators in Surrey
Former bus operators in West Sussex